Sebastian Rudol (born 21 February 1995) is a Polish professional footballer who plays as a centre-back for Motor Lublin.

Career statistics

Club

References

External links
 
 

1995 births
Living people
People from Koszalin
Sportspeople from West Pomeranian Voivodeship
Polish footballers
Polish expatriate footballers
Poland youth international footballers
Poland under-21 international footballers
Association football defenders
Pogoń Szczecin players
Sepsi OSK Sfântu Gheorghe players
Widzew Łódź players
Sandecja Nowy Sącz players
Motor Lublin players
Ekstraklasa players
I liga players
II liga players
Liga I players
Expatriate footballers in Romania
Polish expatriate sportspeople in Romania